SS John M. Brooke was a Liberty ship built in the United States during World War II. She was named after John Mercer Brooke, an early graduate of the United States Naval Academy, he perfected a "deep-sea sounding device", which was instrumental in the creation of the Transatlantic Cable. In 1861, he resigned his commission in the US Navy and joined the Confederate Navy where he was involved with the conversion of the ironclad , the development of a new rifled naval gun, the Brooke rifle, and the establishment of the Confederate States Naval Academy.

Construction
John M. Brooke was laid down on 30 December 1943, under a Maritime Commission (MARCOM) contract, MC hull 1550, by J.A. Jones Construction, Panama City, Florida; she was launched on 24 February 1944.

History
She was allocated to North Atlantic & Gulf SS Co., on 31 March 1944. On 15 May 1946, she was laid up in the National Defense Reserve Fleet, in the James River Group, in Lee Hall, Virginia. On 2 February 1947, she was sold her J.S. Coumantaros, Piraeus, Greece. She was renamed Stavros Coumantaros. She was scrapped in Taiwan, in 1968.

References

Bibliography

 
 
 
 
 

 

Liberty ships
Ships built in Panama City, Florida
1944 ships
James River Reserve Fleet
Liberty ships transferred to Greece